Diego Cafagna (born 9 July 1975) is a former Italian race walker.

Biography
Diego Cafagna participated at one edition of the Summer Olympics (2008), he has 12 caps in national team from 1997 to 2008.

Achievements

See also
 Italian team at the running events
 Italy at the IAAF World Race Walking Cup

References

External links
 

1975 births
Living people
Italian male racewalkers
Sportspeople from Trieste
Athletes (track and field) at the 2008 Summer Olympics
Olympic athletes of Italy
World Athletics Championships athletes for Italy
Athletics competitors of Centro Sportivo Carabinieri
21st-century Italian people